Ramendra Narayan Debbarma (c. 1950 – 11 February 2018) was an Indian politician. 

A member of the Communist Party of India (Marxist), he had worked in the public sector until 2012. He contested the 2013 Tripura Legislative Assembly elections, and was seated. Debbarma won support from CPM in 2018, but died of a cerebral stroke at Gobinda Ballav Panth Medical College and Hospital on 11 February 2018, a week before the election was to be held.

References

1950s births
2018 deaths
Tripura MLAs 2013–2018
Communist Party of India (Marxist) politicians from Tripura